Magne Budho (Nepali: माग्ने बुढो) is a fictional character on the NTV-produced television series Meri Bassai. He is portrayed by comedian actor Kedar Ghimire. Magne Budho has appeared in many Nepali movies such as Cha Ekan Cha, Woda Number 6, Chhakka Panja and he has also appeared in television shows such as Khas Khus and Meri Bassai. He is an old man married to Maiya and has a son named Jureli.

Quotes

Family 
 Mayia - Wife
 Jureli - Son
 Raju Master - Brother
 Bandre - Relative
 Andre - Relative

Filmography

Films 
 Cha Ekan Cha
 Woda Number 6
 Chhakka Panja
 Chhakka Panja 3
 Chhakka Panja 4 (not yet released)

Television series 

Meri Bassai
 Khas Khus

References 

Fictional Nepalese people